Henrik Castegren (born 28 March 1996) is a Swedish professional footballer who plays as a defender for Polish club Lechia Gdańsk.

Club career
On 18 February 2022, Castegren signed a contract with Lechia Gdańsk in Poland until 30 June 2024, with an option to extend.

References

External links 
 

1996 births
Sportspeople from Norrköping
Living people
Swedish footballers
Association football defenders
IFK Norrköping players
IF Sylvia players
Degerfors IF players
Lechia Gdańsk players
Allsvenskan players
Superettan players
Ettan Fotboll players
Ekstraklasa players
Swedish expatriate footballers
Expatriate footballers in Poland
Swedish expatriate sportspeople in Poland
Footballers from Östergötland County